Taylor Daniel Lautner (born February 11, 1992) is an American actor. He is best known for playing shapeshifter  Jacob Black in The Twilight Saga film series.

Lautner began his acting career playing bit parts in comedy series such as The Bernie Mac Show (2003) and My Wife and Kids (2004), before having voice roles in television series like What's New, Scooby-Doo? (2005) and Danny Phantom (2005). In 2005, he appeared in the film Cheaper by the Dozen 2 and starred in The Adventures of Sharkboy and Lavagirl in 3-D. He also starred in the 2011 action film Abduction.

From 2014 to 2018, Lautner starred in the BBC sitcom Cuckoo as the son of the titular character. In 2016, he played a leading role, Dr. Cassidy Cascade, in the second season of FOX black comedy series Scream Queens.

The late 2000s saw Lautner become a teen idol and sex symbol, after extensively changing his physique to keep the role of Jacob Black in further Twilight installments, and generating media attention for his looks. In 2010, he was ranked second on Glamour's "The 50 Sexiest Men of 2010" list, and fourth on People's "Most Amazing Bodies" list. Also in the same year, Lautner was named the highest-paid teenage actor in Hollywood.

Early life
Lautner was born on February 11, 1992, in Grand Rapids, Michigan, the son of Deborah and Daniel Lautner. His mother works for a software development company, while his father was a Midwest Airlines pilot. He has one younger sister named Makena. Raised as a Roman Catholic, Lautner has Dutch, French, and German ancestry, and has stated that he has "distant" Native American ancestry (specifically Odawa and Potawatomi, both Anishinaabe peoples) through his mother. He grew up in Hudsonville, Michigan, a town near Grand Rapids. He has stated that he was bullied in school because he was an actor. He commented, "I just had to tell myself 'I can't let this get to me. This is what I love to do. And I'm going to continue doing it.'"

He took his first karate class at the age of six. A year later, he attended the national karate tournament in Louisville, Kentucky, where he met Michael Chaturantabut, the founder of Xtreme Martial Arts. Chaturantabut invited Lautner to a camp he held at University of California, Los Angeles. Lautner trained with Chaturantabut for several years, earning his black belt by the age of eight, and winning several junior world championships. He appeared in an ISKA karate event televised on ESPN in 2003 that was later lampooned on the sports-comedy show Cheap Seats that first aired in 2006.

In junior high, Lautner—who was involved in karate, baseball and hip-hop dance—won the award for "Best Smile" and played in the school's Turkey Bowl American Football game. He went to public school at Valencia High School in Santa Clarita, California until his sophomore year. Chaturantabut, who once portrayed the Blue Ranger in Power Rangers Lightspeed Rescue, suggested to Lautner that he take up acting. For a few years, the Lautners flew from Michigan to Los Angeles for auditions when his talent agency called, and returned to Grand Rapids for school sometimes the same day. Lautner balanced karate and acting with being on the football and baseball teams at his school, and taking up jazz and hip-hop dance. After that became tiring, Lautner and his family decided to move to California for a month, to try it out, before moving to Santa Clarita, California,  in 2002.

Career

2001–07: Career beginnings
In his first months after moving to Los Angeles, Lautner appeared in small television roles, small film roles, and ads and commercials. In 2001, Lautner first appeared in the made-for-television film, Shadow Fury. He then got a voice-over job in a commercial for Rugrats Go Wild. He then appeared in small television roles on The Bernie Mac Show, My Wife and Kids, and Summerland. Lautner then earned voice-over roles in animated series such as Danny Phantom, Duck Dodgers, and What's New, Scooby-Doo?. The same year, he earned his first breakout role, starring in the film, The Adventures of Sharkboy and Lavagirl in 3-D. Lautner spent three months on location in Austin, Texas, to film the movie, which was received with negative reviews from critics, and was a minor international success. However, Lautner was nominated at the 2006 Young Artist Awards for Best Performance in a Feature Film by a Leading Actor. For the film, Lautner choreographed all of his fight scenes after director Robert Rodríguez learned of his extensive martial arts training. Months later, he played Eliot Murtaugh in Cheaper by the Dozen 2, which was panned by critics, being named one of the "Worst Films of the 2000s" by Rotten Tomatoes. After returning from Canada filming the latter movie, Lautner said he realized his newfound fame, from Sharkboy and Lavagirl. In 2006 he appeared in the show Love Inc. and the TV special He's a Bully, Charlie Brown. Two years later, Lautner appeared in a lead role in the short-lived NBC drama My Own Worst Enemy, portraying Christian Slater's son, Jack Spivey. Rolling Stone coined his early roles as either "the popular kid, jock, or bully."

2008–09: Breakthrough and The Twilight Series
In 2007, filmmakers began a search for actors to portray Jacob Black, a Native American friend of lead character Bella Swan in Twilight, the first film in The Twilight Saga film series. In January 2008, an open casting call was held in Portland, Oregon. Lautner had not heard of the Twilight series before, but was urged by his agent to audition. At his audition, he read lines with Kristen Stewart, who had already been cast as Bella, and they acted out scenes from The Twilight Saga: New Moon and The Twilight Saga: Eclipse. The film was a commercial success, earning $69 million its opening weekend, and has grossed $392 million worldwide. It received mixed reviews from critics, having a "Rotten" rating with a weighted average of 5.5/10. In describing the critical consensus, it stated: "Having lost much of its bite transitioning to the big screen, Twilight will please its devoted fans, but do little for the uninitiated." On Metacritic, which assigns a weighted mean rating out of 100 reviews from film critics, it has an average score of 56 from the 37 reviews. At the 2009 MTV Movie Awards, Lautner was nominated for Male Breakthrough Performance, which was won by co-star Robert Pattinson.

Initially, director Chris Weitz wanted to recast the role of Jacob Black for Twilight's sequel, The Twilight Saga: New Moon, due to the major physical changes that occur in Black between the two novels, and have an actor that would accurately portray "the new, larger Jacob Black." Black's role in the novel also increases significantly, with him falling in love with Bella and becoming a shapeshifter, putting the actor in a starring role. Representatives for Weitz had stated that they would make a full effort to recast the "high-profile gig," and MTV News confirmed that Weitz was looking at Michael Copon to take on the role; however, Summit Entertainment said a decision had not been made. In an attempt to keep the role, Lautner weight-trained extensively and gained approximately 30 pounds of muscle. In January 2009, Weitz and Summit Entertainment announced that Lautner would continue to play the role of Jacob in the sequel. In an interview, fellow cast member Kristen Stewart talked about Lautner's transformation saying, "He's an entirely different person physically." Stewart later said, "He gets a lot of attention because he's buff, but I think as soon as the movie comes out, people are going to realize that's not why he got the job." Co-star Robert Pattinson said after seeing Lautner's body, "I saw him and thought 'Jesus, I'm going to get fired.'" In an interview with The Wrap, Weitz said Lautner deserved a lot of credit for the movie's box office, stating, "If you look at the movie, it should have been the weakest in the franchise, because Robert Pattinson doesn't play as big a role." Weitz said Lautner had to "pick up that slack, and if his character hadn't been emotionally, not just physically, appealing, the movie wouldn't have been as big a hit." The commercial performance of the film outpaced the first film, setting several box office records including the biggest midnight opening in the United States and Canada and the biggest single-day opening. The opening weekend of New Moon is the third highest opening weekend in domestic history with $142,839,137. The Twilight Saga: New Moon also has the sixth highest worldwide opening weekend with $274.9 million total. Critical reception was less favorable, with the movie getting a 4.6/10 average from Rotten Tomatoes, and a 44 on Metacritic. Lautner won Favorite Breakout Movie Actor at the 35th People's Choice Awards.

Although it began after the release of the first film, upon release of New Moon, Lautner and his co-stars Stewart and Pattinson transitioned to teen idol status, with Lautner particularly admired by teens for his new physical characteristics, becoming a sex symbol. The trio appeared on many covers and televised appearances together. In between the second and third films in the Twilight series, Lautner was a part of the ensemble cast in the movie Valentine's Day as Willy Harrington, acting alongside his rumored girlfriend at the time, American singer-songwriter Taylor Swift. The duo was nominated at the 2010 MTV Movie Awards for Best Kiss. Although it received generally negative reviews, the film grossed $213 million and had the second biggest opening in the United States for a romantic comedy film. Lautner presented at the 2009 MTV Video Music Awards and the 82nd Academy Awards. Lautner hosted Saturday Night Live on December 12, 2009, making him one of the youngest celebrity hosts in the show's history.

2010–present: Continuing Twilight and later projects
Lautner returned for the third Twilight film, The Twilight Saga: Eclipse, in 2010. Despite receiving mixed reviews from critics, the film surpassed its predecessor to become the highest-grossing film of the franchise and the highest-grossing romantic fantasy, shapeshifter and vampire movie of all time at the American and Canadian box office. It ranks as the 36th highest-grossing film of all-time in the U.S. and Canada. The popularity of Lautner and his cast members continued to summit, especially via the "Team Edward vs. Team Jacob" campaign that promoted the film. Lautner's fanbase also began to expand to older audiences. Lautner won Best Fantasy Actor at the 2010 Scream Awards, and he is nominated for Favorite Movie Actor for his role in Eclipse at the 37th People's Choice Awards. In November 2010 The Hollywood Reporter named Lautner as one of the young male actors who are "pushing – or being pushed" into taking over Hollywood as the new "A-List".

Lautner was initially supposed to be in two films, Northern Lights and a movie based on Max Steel, but pulled out of both films due to scheduling conflicts and better offers. Other planned projects were the lead in a movie about Stretch Armstrong and a hostage thriller, Cancun. Lautner filmed a Bourne Identity-esque spy film with Lily Collins, entitled Abduction. It was released in September 2011 to universally negative reviews from critics and Lautner's performance was heavily criticised. He appeared in the remaining parts of the Twilight series, The Twilight Saga: Breaking Dawn films, which were released over a two-year period from 2011–2012. Lautner then filmed Grown Ups 2 alongside Adam Sandler and Chris Rock. It was released in September 2013.

In 2010, Lautner was considered to be the highest-paid teen actor in Hollywood. In February 2014, it was confirmed that Lautner would be joining the BBC Three comedy series Cuckoo, replacing Andy Samberg. Lautner has continued in this role, co-starring in the BBC comedy for three series. From September to December 2016, Lautner co-starred on the Ryan Murphy comedy horror series Scream Queens.

Public image

Publications such as GQ, Rolling Stone, and People have referred to Lautner as a sex symbol, with the latter publication calling the actor a future epitome of pop culture. He has been called the new young adult star that can "both woo the girls with his intensity and impress the boys with his rugged agility." According to Mickey Rapkin of GQ, the use of Lautner's physique in films has been compared to Megan Fox in her work. After his massive physical change following Twilight, Lautner became a tabloid teen idol with his co-stars Robert Pattinson and Kristen Stewart. Michelle Lanz of MSN Wonderwall said that Lautner's change may have saved his career. Several critics credit Lautner's physical characteristics for much of the success of the Twilight series, with critic Sharon Waxman stating, "as a tabloid teen idol, he certainly deserves some credit for New Moon's $700 million worldwide gross." Lautner's abs in particular have been subject to media attention, with The Wrap stating that companies bidding for the actor in movies in 2011 would "shell out for the young actor's much-on-display though mostly untried abs." Mickey Rapkin of GQ said, "the film's marketing issues were solved when Lautner's "abdominal muscles became New Moon's main talking point, not to mention his calling card." He was named number one on Access Hollywood's "Top 5 Hollywood Abs" list.

Before the actor turned 18, his sexualized image was often critiqued, and subject to controversy. In December 2009, Lautner appeared on the cover of Rolling Stone in a wet T-shirt. Jennifer Cady of E! Online said to wait a few months when Lautner would "be of age, which will make this whole operation you got going on completely legal." In his interview with the magazine, after declining to talk about whether he was dating Taylor Swift, the magazine pressed Lautner on rumors of him being gay, which he brushed off. Brent Hartinger, a columnist for AfterElton, blasted the magazine, calling the questioning "unimaginably irresponsible," commenting that Lautner was just "a 17-year old kid" and that while the rumors were baseless and speculation from certain blogs and fans, it was disappointing that a "legitimate media outlet" would print gossip. Hartinger said the magazine reached a "new low" and did not have common decency, noting that the line between child and adult "is there for a good reason".

Lautner has stated that he does not want to be just known for his looks, as some have attributed his popularity to that and not his actual acting skill. In an interview, the actor revealed that he was originally supposed to have a baring scene in the movie Valentine's Day. He stated, "The script said we were walking into school and Willy takes off his shirt. I said, 'Whoa, whoa, whoa. Time out. He's gonna take off his shirt in the middle of school? No, no, no. The reason I took off my shirt for New Moon is because it's written in the book that way. And there's reasons behind it." Lautner later said he would not bare his chest for any role that did not call for it. In June 2010, Lautner covered GQ magazine. The actor was lampooned in conservative writer Laura Ingraham's satirical The Obama Diaries, commenting to have Lautner as a mascot for the White House Easter Egg Roll, to fit their health-conscious theme, and have Lautner don a furry bunny head and appear shirtless. In 2010, Lautner was ranked number two on Glamour's "50 Sexiest Men of 2010 " list. Men's Health ranked him at third on their list of "Top 10 Summer Bodies." Additionally in 2010, he was ranked fourth on People's "Most Amazing Bodies" list.

Personal life
Lautner has an intricate workout plan, which was covered by Men's Health, and has a specific diet after developing his body for The Twilight Saga: New Moon. In addition, he still practices and trains in martial arts regularly. He has stated that he is drug- and alcohol-free.

While filming Valentine's Day in October 2009, Lautner began a romantic relationship with co-star Taylor Swift; they broke up later that year. After filming Abduction with Lily Collins, he began dating her in November 2010. They split in September 2011. From 2013 to 2015 he was in a relationship with Canadian actress and Tracers co-star Marie Avgeropoulos. Lautner began dating actress and Scream Queens co-star Billie Lourd in December 2016; the two split in July 2017. In 2018, Lautner announced that he was dating Taylor "Tay" Dome, a nurse from California. On November 13, 2021, he announced via Instagram that they were engaged. The pair married on November 11, 2022, in California. Lautner previously stated Dome would take his last name upon marriage, making her name "Taylor Lautner".

On the Late Show with David Letterman, Lautner said that if he does not have work, he would like to go back to school; in 2010 he stated, "I finished high school and enrolled in my local community college". In 2020, he bought a home in Agoura Hills, while retaining his  estate in Castaic.

Filmography

Film

Television

Awards and nominations

References

External links

 

1992 births
American male child actors
American male film actors
American male karateka
American people of Dutch descent
American people of French descent
American people of German descent
American people of Potawatomi descent
American male television actors
American male voice actors
Living people
Male actors from Grand Rapids, Michigan
People from Hudsonville, Michigan
21st-century American male actors
American people of Austrian descent
American people of Irish descent
American people of English descent
American people of Swiss descent
American people who self-identify as being of Native American descent
People from Valencia, Santa Clarita, California
Catholics from Michigan
Catholics from California